Jahanuma is a populated area in Hyderabad, Telangana.

The Falaknuma Palace, Falaknuma Railway Station and Falaknuma Bus Depot are located in this area.

References

Neighbourhoods in Hyderabad, India